The Two-Ocean Navy Act, also known as the Vinson-Walsh Act, was a United States law enacted on July 19, 1940, and named for Carl Vinson and David I. Walsh, who chaired the Naval Affairs Committee in the House and Senate respectively. The largest naval procurement bill in U.S. history, it increased the size of the United States Navy by 70%.

History
Modest naval expansion programs had been implemented by the Vinson-Trammell Act of 1934 and the Naval Act of 1938.  In early June 1940, the U.S. Congress passed legislation that provided an 11% increase in naval tonnage as well as an expansion of naval air capacity. On June 17, a few days after German troops conquered France, Chief of Naval Operations Harold Stark requested four billion dollars from Congress to increase the size of the American combat fleet by 70%, adding 257 ships amounting to 1,325,000 tons. On June 18, after less than an hour of debate, the House of Representatives by a 316–0 vote authorized $8.55 billion for a naval expansion program, that put emphasis on aircraft. Rep. Vinson, who headed the House Naval Affairs Committee, said its emphasis on carriers did not represent any less commitment to battleships, but "The modern development of aircraft has demonstrated conclusively that the backbone of the Navy today is the aircraft carrier. The carrier, with destroyers, cruisers and submarines grouped around it[,] is the spearhead of all modern naval task forces." The Two-Ocean Navy Act was enacted on July 19, 1940.

The Act authorized the procurement of:

 8 s
 2 s
 5  battleships
 6  large cruisers
 4 s 
 13 s
 4  anti-aircraft cruisers
 115 destroyers including 100 , 13 , and 2  destroyers 
 43 s
 15,000 aircraft
 The conversion of 100,000 tons of auxiliary ships
 $50 million for patrol, escort and other vessels
 $150 million for essential equipment and facilities
 $65 million for the manufacture of ordnance material or munitions
 $35 million for the expansion of facilities

The expansion program was scheduled to take five to six years, but a New York Times study of shipbuilding capabilities called it, "problematical" unless proposed "radical changes in design" were dropped.

See also
 Washington Naval Conference
 Washington Naval Treaty

References

1940 in American law
United States Navy in the 20th century
United States federal defense and national security legislation
76th United States Congress
1940 in the United States
1940 in military history